The 2019–20 Princeton Tigers men's basketball team represent Princeton University in the 2019–20 NCAA Division I men's basketball season. The Tigers, led by 9th-year head coach Mitch Henderson, play their home games at Jadwin Gymnasium in Princeton, New Jersey as members of the Ivy League.

Previous season
The Tigers finished the 2018–19 season 16–12 overall, 8–6 in Ivy League play, to finish in third place. In the Ivy League tournament, they were defeated by Yale in the semifinals.

Offseason

Departures

Roster

Schedule and results

|-
!colspan=12 style=| Non-conference regular season

|-
!colspan=12 style=| Ivy League regular season

|-
!colspan=12 style=| Ivy League Tournament
|-

|-

Source

References

Princeton Tigers men's basketball seasons
Princeton Tigers
Princeton Tigers men's basketball
Princeton Tigers men's basketball